is a city located in Chiba Prefecture, Japan. , the city had an estimated population of  200,136 in 84,800 households and a population density of 5,700 persons per km2.

Geography
Nagareyama is located in the far northwestern corner of Chiba Prefecture, bordered by the Edogawa River to the west. It is about 30 kilometers from the prefectural capital at Chiba and within 20 to 30 kilometers from the center of Tokyo. The city area is long from north to south, and the central and northern parts of the city form part of the Shimōsa Plateau, with almost the entire area as either residential or farmland. The Edo River runs north and south along the western border of the city,  opposite which is Saitama Prefecture. In addition, the Tone Canal runs through the northern part of the city.

Neighboring municipalities
Chiba Prefecture
Matsudo
Kashiwa
Noda
Saitama Prefecture
Misato
Yoshikawa

Climate
Nagareyama has a humid subtropical climate (Köppen Cfa) characterized by warm summers and cool winters with light to no snowfall.  The average annual temperature in Nagareyama is 14.8 °C. The average annual rainfall is 1370 mm with September as the wettest month. The temperatures are highest on average in August, at around 26.6 °C, and lowest in January, at around 4.0 °C.

Demographics
Per Japanese census data, the population of Nagareyama has seen strong growth from the 1950s to the present day. As Japan's overall population reached its peak in the early 21st century, Nagareyama's continued growth has been attributed to city policies from 2003 to heavily invest in childcare centers, including a transit service at Nagareyama-centralpark Station where parents can drop off their children on their way to work, with the children then shuttled with buses to daycare centers. Senior people of the local community help caring for the children. Many parents say this transit service was one of the biggest reasons for them to move to Nagareyama. There are also many local events and community spaces where children and elderly interact. There is also a summer camp which children can attend while their parents work during holidays. These family friendly approaches lured young working parents from Tokyo to Nagareyama.

History
During the Edo period, Nagareyama was a river port on the Edogawa River and was noted for its production of mirin, a sweetened sake used for cooking. After the Meiji Restoration, Nagareyama Town was created in Inba District, Chiba Prefecture on April 1, 1889 with the establishment of the modern municipalities system.  On January 1, 1952, it merged with neighboring Edogawa Town. Nagareyama was raised to city status on January 1, 1967.

Government
Nagareyama has a mayor-council form of government with a directly elected mayor and a unicameral city council of 28 members. Nagareyama contributes two members to the Chiba Prefectural Assembly. In terms of national politics, the city is part of Chiba 7th district of the lower house of the Diet of Japan.

Economy
Nagareyama is a regional commercial center and a commuter town for nearby Chiba and Tokyo. The commuting rate is 33.5% to central of Tokyo and 12.5% to Kashiwa.

Education

Universities
Edogawa University
Toyo Gakuen University
Edogawa Junior College

Primary and secondary education
Nagareyama has 17 public elementary schools and nine public middle schools operated by the city government, and four public high schools operated by the Chiba Prefectural Board of Education. There is also one private elementary school. The prefecture also operates one special education school for the handicapped.

Transportation

Railway
 Ryūtetsu - Nagareyama Line
 –  – 
 Tōbu Railway -  Tōbu Urban Park Line
 -  - 
 JR East –  Musashino Line

 Metropolitan Intercity Railway Company  -  Tsukuba Express
 -  -

Highway

International relations

Twin towns — Sister cities
Nagareyama is twinned with:
  Sōma, Fukushima, Japan (1977)
  Shinano, Nagano, Japan (1997)
  Noto, Ishikawa, Japan (2012)

Noted people from Nagareyama
Hidekazu Otani, professional soccer player
Yukiko Sumiyoshi, manga artist

In fiction
The fictional Nagarekawa of Locodol is based on Nagareyama. After the anime's release, the characters have become the city's official tourism concierge.

References

External links

Official Website 

 
Cities in Chiba Prefecture